Conns Creek (also rendered Conn's Creek) is a stream in the U.S. state of Indiana.

The creek bears the name of a family of settlers.

See also
List of rivers of Indiana

References

Rivers of Rush County, Indiana
Rivers of Shelby County, Indiana
Rivers of Indiana